2-Nitrodiphenylamine, also called NDPA, 2-NDPA, 2NO2DPA, Sudan Yellow 1339, C.I. 10335, CI 10335, phenyl 2-nitrophenylamine, 2-nitro-N-phenylaniline, or N-phenyl-o-nitroaniline, is an organic chemical, a nitrated aromatic amine, a derivate of diphenylamine. Its chemical formula is C12H10N2O2, or C6H5NHC6H4NO2. It is a red crystalline solid, usually in form of flakes or powder, with melting point of 74-76 °C and boiling point of 346 °C. It is polar but hydrophobic. 

2-Nitrodiphenylamine is used as a stabilizer for synthetic rubbers, explosives, propellants (e.g. in Otto fuel II, smokeless powders, in some US Army double-base propellants in solid rockets, and in other applications involving nitric acid esters), plastics, and lubricants. It is also an intermediate for organic synthesis, and a civilian solvent dye.

In some explosives, it is used to control the explosion. One of its major uses is to control the explosion rate of propylene glycol dinitrate.

As a stabilizer, its major role is to eliminate the acidic nitrates and nitrogen oxides produced by gradual decomposition of nitric acid esters, which would otherwise autocatalyze further decomposition. Its amount is usually 1-2% of the mixture; higher amounts than 2% degrade the propellant's ballistic properties. The amount of the stabilizer depletes with time; remaining content of less than 0.5% (with initial 2% content) requires increased surveillance of the munition, with less than 0.2% warranting immediate disposal, as the depletion of the stabilizer may lead to autoignition of the propellant. 

Other stabilizers of a similar nature are 4-nitrodiphenylamine, N-nitrosodiphenylamine. While N-methyl-p-nitroaniline(MNA also used in IMX-101), and diphenylamine(DPA) are more commonly employed.

References

External links
 General information

Anilines
Nitrobenzenes
Dyes
Pyrotechnic chemicals